The American Sign Museum in Cincinnati, Ohio, preserves, archives, and displays a collection of signs. The museum also displays the equipment utilized in the design and manufacture of signs. Tod Swormstedt began working on the museum in 1999. It opened to the public in 2005.

Background
Swormstedt's family owns the signage industry trade journal Signs of the Times, which has been published since 1906. Swormstedt's grandfather, H.C. Menefee, was the first editor of the publication, and purchased it for himself in 1911. Swormstedt had been working at the journal for over twenty years before becoming inspired to start a sign museum in 1999. His family provided $1 million for the project, and figures from the signage industry gave donations of their own. The museum was founded as a nonprofit corporation. Swormstedt considered building the museum in Los Angeles, St. Louis, Memphis, and other sites, but eventually settled on Cincinnati, the base of operations for Signs of the Times.

Collection
Over 200 signs and other objects are on display at the museum, and over 3,800 items are cataloged. The collection ranges from the late nineteenth century to the 1970s. Highlights of the collection include samples of gold leaf lettering on glass, a Sputnik-like plastic orb from an Anaheim shopping center, a rotating neon windmill from a Denver donut shop, Las Vegas showcards, and a fiberglass Frisch's Big Boy statue with a slingshot in his pocket. (The slingshot was omitted from later models of the Big Boy statue.) One can also find signs from businesses such as Big Bear Stores, Howard Johnson's, and Earl Scheib.  Over the museum's entrance, visitors are greeted by a  fiberglass genie from a Los Angeles carpet company.

In 2008, the museum acquired a single-arch 1963 McDonald's sign from Huntsville, Alabama. The sign features McDonald's Speedee character, who was phased out in favor of Ronald McDonald in the 1960s. In 2009, the museum added a neon sign from Johnny’s Big Red Grill, once a popular restaurant among Cornell University students.

2007–2012: Growth
Many signs owned by the museum were too large to fit the original exhibit space.  To better accommodate the collection, the museum began purchasing a  property in Camp Washington, Cincinnati, in 2007. The new location is part of the Oesterlein Machine Company-Fashion Frocks, Inc. Complex, a National Register of Historic Places building. The museum opened in its new home in June 2012, and the building displays about 500 signs and artifacts, many of which are on a faux streetscape in a town called "Signville".

Neonworks of Cincinnati moved its business into the museum's new location and features a live exhibit showing visitors how they restore neon signs.

See also
 Neon Museum at the Fremont Street Experience in Las Vegas

References

External links
American Sign Museum Official site

Museums in Cincinnati
Mass media museums in the United States
Design museums in the United States
Signage
Industry museums in Ohio
Neon lighting
Museums established in 1999
1999 establishments in Ohio